The 1958–59 Copa del Generalísimo was the 57th staging of the Copa del Rey. The competition began on 21 December 1958 and concluded on 21 June 1959 with the final.

First round

|}

Tiebreaker

|}

Round of 32

|}
Tiebreaker

|}

Round of 16

|}
Tiebreaker

|}

Quarter-finals

|}

Semi-finals

|}

Tiebreaker

|}

Final

|}

External links
 www.linguasport.com 

Copa del Rey seasons
Copa del Rey
Copa